Sophie Alexander (born 25 May 1993) is an Australian rules footballer playing for Essendon in the AFL Women's (AFLW). She was a basketballer in the South East Australian Basketball League before taking up football in the Victorian Women's Football League. Alexander spent a year in Collingwood's VFL Women's (VFLW) team before ascending to the senior list through the 2018 AFLW draft, where she played until the end of the 2022 AFL Women's season.

Sporting career 
Alexander played basketball for the Ballarat Rush in the South East Australian Basketball League. After five years with the Rush, she took up football in 2016 with Redan Football Club in the Victorian Women's Football League, playing six matches. Alexander also started playing for the Horsham Lady Hornets in the Country Basketball League. In 2017, she played 13 games with the Eastern Devils in the VFL Women's, playing in the forward line and midfield. Coach Brendan Major noted her ability to score from outside the 50-metre arc, a rarity in women's football. Alexander was invited to the 2017 AFLW draft combine but was not selected in the 2017 draft. She joined Collingwood's VFLW side in 2018 and was named in the VFLW Team of the Year on the interchange bench. Alexander was also the club's leading goalkicker.

For the 2018 AFLW draft, Collingwood was granted two chances to pre-select recruits to compensate for losing players to injury and rival clubs, using a similar bidding mechanism to the father–daughter rule. Collingwood chose Alexander and Erica Fowler; an unspecified club bid on Alexander, requiring Collingwood to match the bid with its next available selection: pick 29. Alexander kicked the first goal of the 2019 AFLW season in her opening round debut; however, she was concussed in the third quarter after a marking contest.

In May 2022, Alexander left Collingwood to join expansion club Essendon.

Personal life 
Alexander is from Ballarat, Victoria, and studied paramedicine and nursing at university.

Statistics
Statistics are correct the end of the 2022 season.

|- style="background-color: #eaeaea"
! scope="row" style="text-align:center" | 2019
|style="text-align:center;"|
| 24 || 4 || 1 || 2 || 17 || 5 || 22 || 7 || 5 || 0.3 || 0.5 || 4.3 || 1.3 || 5.5 || 1.8 || 1.3
|- 
! scope="row" style="text-align:center" | 2020
|style="text-align:center;"|
| 24 || 5 || 3 || 2 || 12 || 8 || 20 || 8 || 5 || 0.6 || 0.4 || 2.4 || 1.6 || 4.0 || 1.6 || 1.0
|- style="background-color: #eaeaea"
! scope="row" style="text-align:center" | 2021
|style="text-align:center;"|
| 24 || 11 || 6 || 10 || 40 || 38 || 78 || 22 || 11 || 0.5 || 0.9 || 3.6 || 3.5 || 7.1 || 2.0 || 1.0
|- 
! scope="row" style="text-align:center" | 2022
|style="text-align:center;"|
| 24 || 11 || 6 || 5 || 37 || 25 || 62 || 20 || 10 || 0.5 || 0.5 || 3.4 || 2.3 || 5.6 || 1.8 || 0.9
|- class="sortbottom"
! colspan=3| Career
! 31
! 16
! 19
! 106
! 76
! 182
! 57
! 31
! 0.5
! 0.6
! 3.4
! 2.5
! 5.9
! 1.8
! 1.0
|}

References

External links 

 

Living people
1993 births
Australian rules footballers from Ballarat
Redan Football Club players
Collingwood Football Club (AFLW) players
Victorian Women's Football League players
Essendon Football Club (AFLW) players
Sportswomen from Victoria (Australia)